The Brunei Museum is the national museum of Brunei. It is located in Kota Batu in the capital Bandar Seri Begawan. The museum has exhibits of Islamic art, historical period of the 16th century and archaeology and ethnography. It is the largest museum in Brunei. The museum has been closed since 2014 for repairs and upgrade, and was expected to reopen in 2020, but remains closed in 2022.

The museum published the first Brunei Museum Journal, an academic journal in 1969, which is an annual feature now.

Location
The museum is located in Kota Batu, about 4.5 kilometres or 3 miles from the capital's city centre. It sits on a hill overlooking the Brunei River. It is located near the Kota Batu archaeological site, as well as the royal mausoleums of Sultan Sharif Ali and Sultan Bolkiah, the 3rd and 5th Sultans of Brunei respectively.

History
The museum was established in 1965 and initially housed at the Civic Centre in the capital (then known as Brunei Town). It was then decided to be relocated to a permanent site in Kota Batu. The construction of the new building began in 1968 and was completed in 1970 at a cost of M$4.39 million at that time. It was inaugurated on 29 February 1972 by Queen Elizabeth II.

Building 
The museum building is decorated with traditional Malay motifs, similar to that on the tomb of Sultan Bolkiah, ruler of the Bruneian Empire in the 15th century.

The museum has three floors.

Exhibits
The museum has a number of galleries such as Islamic-art gallery, a natural history gallery, and a gallery to hold temporary exhibitions. The History gallery is where the displays relate to the history of Southeast Asia with relevance to Brunei from the time of the Spanish and Portuguese occupation in the 16th century.

Exhibits of the history of the ancient period of the Negara Darussalam and the latest period are part of the history gallery. Exhibits cover traditional life pattern of the many communities in the country, and of the natural history of its flora and fauna. The 9th and 10th centuries exhibits are pottery from Iran and Central Asia, blown glass from Egypt and the Levant, a miniature manuscript of Quran, woven textile, gold ornaments, the ceremonial cannons used within the country, and weaponry of the sultanate.

Most artefacts are the personal collections of the Sultan of Brunei including the silver and gold coins collected from a broad spectrum of the Islamic world. Another notable exhibit is a display titled "The Spirit of Budo: The History of Japan's Martial Arts" which consists of replicas of the suits of armour and weapons used in Japan during the 8th to 14th centuries. There is also a display of the oil industry in Brunei created by the local Brunei Shell Petroleum, which shows discovery of oil, as it has significant impact on the economy of Brunei. Exhibits of large size are on display in rooms at the back of the museum building in the park area. The administrative and technical sections of the museum are located in the basement floor.

Closure 
The museum has been closed since 2014 to make way for structural repairs due to severe termite infestation. The closure has also been intended to make way for upgrade, which includes redesigning the interior and exhibits, incorporating more interactivity and modern technology, and creating a new open-concept gallery. The museum was expected to open by the end of 2020, but remains closed in 2022.

See also 
 List of museums in Brunei

References

External links 
 

Museums in Brunei
National museums